The Treaty of Granada, also known as the Capitulation of Granada or simply the Capitulations, was signed and ratified on November 25, 1491, between Boabdil, the sultan of Granada, and Ferdinand and Isabella, the King and Queen of Castile, León, Aragon and Sicily. It ended the Granada War, which had started in 1482 and culminated in the siege and battle of Granada, which began in spring 1491.

The treaty provided a short truce, followed by the relinquishment in January 1492 of the sovereignty of the Muslim Emirate of Granada (founded in the 13th century) to Catholic Spain. The treaty guaranteed a set of rights to the Moors, Muslim inhabitants, including religious tolerance and fair treatment in return for their surrender and capitulation. The Capitulations granted native Jews in the surrendered territories the choice of either converting to Christianity or migrating to North Africa within three years. That was subsequently superseded by the Alhambra Decree of 1492, which forced all Jews in Spain to choose between conversion or expulsion.

Terms 

The capitulation of 1492 contained sixty-seven articles among which were the following:
 That both great and small should be perfectly secure in their persons, families and properties.
 That they should be allowed to continue in their dwellings and residences, whether in the city, the suburbs or any other part of the country.
 That their laws should be preserved as they were before, and that no none should judge them except by those same laws.
 That their mosques and the religious endowments appertaining to them should remain as they were in the times of Islam.
 That no Christian should enter the house of a Muslim or insult him in any way.
 That no Christian or Jew holding public offices by the appointment of the late Sultan should be allowed to exercise his functions or rule over them.
 That all Muslim captives taken during the siege of Granada, from whatever part of the country they might have come, but especially the nobles and chiefs mentioned in the agreement should be liberated.
 That such Muslim captives as might have escaped from their Christians masters and taken refuge in Granada should not be surrendered, but the Sultan should be bound to pay the price of such captives to their owners.
 That all those who might choose to cross over to Africa should be allowed to take their departure within a certain time and be conveyed thither in the king's ships, and without any pecuniary tax being imposed on them beyond the mere charge for passage, and
 That after the expiration of that time no Muslim should be hindered from departing provided he paid, in addition to the price of his passage, the tithe of whatever property he might carry along with him.
 That no one should be prosecuted and punished for the crime of another man.
 That the Christians who had embraced Islam should not be compelled to relinquish it and adopt their former creed.
 That any Muslim wishing to become a Christian should be allowed some days to consider the step he was about to take.after which he was to be questioned by both a Muslim and a Christian judge concerning his intended change and if, after that examination, he still refused to return to Islam, he should be permitted to follow his own inclination.
 That no Muslim should be prosecuted for the death of a Christian slain during the siege and that no restitution of property taken during the war should be enforced.
 That no Muslim should be subject to have Christian soldiers billeted upon him or be transported to provinces of this kingdom against his will.
 That no increase should be made to the usual imposts but that on the contrary all oppressive taxes lately imposed should be immediately suppressed.
 That no Christian should be allowed to peep over the wall or into the house of a Muslim or enter a mosque.
 That any Muslim choosing to travel or reside among the Christians should be perfectly secure in his person and property.
 That no badge or distinctive mark be put upon them, as was done with the Jews and Mudejares.
 That no muezzin should be interrupted in the act of calling the people to prayer and no Muslim molested either in the performance of his daily devotions or in the observance of his fast or in any other religious ceremony, but if a Christian should be found laughing at them, he should be punished for it.
 That the Muslims should be exempted from all taxation for a certain number of years.
 That the Lord of Rome, the Pope, should be requested to give his assent to the above conditions, and sign the treaty himself. [This request by the Moorish side was not carried out.]

Implementation and breakdown 

Initially, the Catholic conquerors implemented and reinforced the generous terms of the treaty. A joint municipal council was established in Granada, and the Muslims were allowed to elect their own representatives. Despite pressure from the Spanish clergy, Ferdinand chose a laissez-faire policy towards the Muslim in the hope that interaction with Catholics would make them "understand the error" of their faith and abandon it. Hernando de Talavera, a friar of converso origins known for his moderation and piety, was appointed as the archbishop of Granada. He was known for his preference of preaching based on "Catholic reasoning", as opposed to "punishments and lashes". When Ferdinand and Isabella visited the city in the summer of 1499, they were greeted by enthusiastic crowd, including Muslims.

At the same time, Cardinal Francisco Jiménez de Cisneros, the archbishop of Toledo, arrived in Granada and began working alongside Talavera. Cisneros disliked Talavera's approach, and began sending uncooperative Muslims, especially the noblemen, to prison where they were treated harshly until they agreed to convert. Emboldened by the increase in conversions, Cisneros intensified the efforts and in December 1499 he told Pope Alexander VI that three thousand Muslims converted in a single day. Cisneros's own church council warned that these methods might be a breach of the Treaty, the 16th-century hagiographer Álvar Gómez de Castro described the approach as "methods that were not correct".

In December 1499, amid the increasingly forced conversions and triggered by an incident involving an attempt by the authorities to reconvert a Muslim woman who had converted from Christianity, the population of Albayzín, the Muslim quarter of Granada, began an open and armed revolt. Talavera and Captain-General Tendilla resolved the situation by negotiating with the Muslims. Meanwhile, Cisneros was summoned to the court in Seville to account for his actions. He convinced the Catholic monarchs to issue a collective pardons on the rebels on the condition that they converted to Christianity. Consequently, the whole city of Granada nominally became Christian, and the treaty began to unravel.

See also
 List of treaties
 Reconquista
 Morisco Revolt
 Timeline of the Muslim presence in the Iberian Peninsula

Notes

References

 Early Modern Spain: A Documentary History, ed. Jon Cowans, University of Pennsylvania Press, 2003. pp. 15–19 Conditions
 In Spanish, the original source is Historia de la Rebellión y Castigo de los Moriscos del Reino de Granada by Luis del Mármol Carvajal.
 See also El Reino Nazarí de Granada by Cristobal Torrez Delgado and Los Moriscos del Reino de Granada by Julio Caro Barrata.

Granada
1490s treaties
Granada (1491)
Peace treaties of Spain
Granada (1491)
Granada (1491)
History of Granada
Ferdinand II of Aragon
Isabella I of Castile
Treaties of the Emirate of Granada
1491 in Spain
15th century in Aragon
15th century in Castile
1491